The Abarth Simca 2000 was an Italian high-performance automobile produced in the 1960s as a collaborative project of the Simca and Abarth companies in Turin, Italy.

Product description
Its fuel tank held 6.6 imperial gallons, although optional tanks of 12.1, 18.7 and 24.2 imperial gallons were also available.

The car's radiator-cooling inlet was a low-set oval in a forward-thrusting nose; there was no obvious forward bumper.  The two headlights were set under transparent fairings.  The bonnet was long and markedly sloped.  Its windshield was more highly sloped than most contemporary vehicles.  An upturned air deflector was mounted atop the rear trunk.

The gasoline tank was filled through a lid-covered cap located at the upper-right hand corner of the nearly-flat rear window.

References

L. A. Manwaring, The Observer's Book of Automobiles (12th ed., 1966), Library of Congress catalog card #62-9807, p. 27
Photographs of 1964 model at https://web.archive.org/web/20090411090141/http://www.thecobraferrariwars.com/1543309.html
Abarth Simca 2000 - Car Profile http://www.sportscardigest.com/car-profile-abarth-simca-2000/

Abarth vehicles
Simca vehicles
Cars introduced in 1963
Sports cars
Rear-engined vehicles